The 2010 Subway Fresh Fit 600 was a NASCAR Sprint Cup Series motor race held on April 10, 2010 at Phoenix International Raceway in Avondale, Arizona. It was the seventh race of the 2010 NASCAR Sprint Cup Series season. The event began at 7:30 p.m. EDT. It was televised live in the United States on Fox and its U.S. radio coverage was broadcast on Motor Racing Network starting at 6:30 p.m. EDT. It was also the longest race held there since 1988.

The race, contested over 378 laps, was won by Ryan Newman from Stewart-Haas Racing, after starting fourteenth to polesitter A. J. Allmendinger. Jeff Gordon finished second for Hendrick Motorsports, while his teammate Jimmie Johnson finished the race in third. The race had a total of nine cautions and twenty lead changes among thirteen different drivers.

Race report

Practices and qualifying

During the first practice, the fastest cars were Denny Hamlin, Michael McDowell, Jamie McMurray, Kurt Busch, and Dale Earnhardt Jr.; near the end of the practice session Tony Stewart lost control of his car. The second practice began with several spins by drivers such as Kyle Busch, Marcos Ambrose, and Jimmie Johnson. The fastest drivers in the session were Jeff Gordon, A. J. Allmendinger, Ryan Newman, Greg Biffle, and Jeff Burton. During qualifying, Allmendinger won the pole position, while David Stremme, Aric Almirola, Mike Bliss, and Brandon Ash failed to qualify for the race.

Race summary
The pre-race ceremonies began with a moment of silence honoring the fallen coal miners in West Virginia; then Phoenix International Raceway's chaplain Ken Bowers gave the invocation. The national anthem, played on the trumpet, was performed by Dr. Jesse McGuire. Following this, professional boxer and grand marshal Laila Ali delivered the command to start engines. At 7:46 p.m EST, Allmendinger led the field to the green flag to start the race. After 14 laps, the first caution came out because Kasey Kahne and Kurt Busch made contact. On lap 22, Ryan Newman restarted in the lead, but the second caution came out one lap later because Jamie McMurray spun out. On the ensuing restart on lap 29, Tony Stewart led the drivers to the green flag. Stewart led until Juan Pablo Montoya passed him on lap 38. Then on lap 58, Brian Vickers spun and slammed the outside wall bringing out the third caution. Montoya led the race on the next restart on lap 63. The race proceeded to go caution-free for 72 laps.

During the long run, Jimmie Johnson passed Montoya on lap 130 as green flag pit stops were under way. Montoya regained the lead after the pit stops, but a lap later the fourth caution came out because of debris. The green flag was given on lap 148, with Montoya the leader. On lap 149, Johnson passed Montoya for the lead. After the lead change, the race underwent a green flag run until lap 190 when the fifth caution came out as a result of oil on the track in turn two. Every driver on the lead lap made a pit stop; Johnson kept the lead coming off pit road. Shortly after the restart on lap 196, the sixth caution came out because Brad Keselowski slammed into the wall. The restart happened on lap 201 with Johnson the leader. After the restart, the race had a run of green flag laps which ended because of the seventh caution on lap 256, caused by David Reutimann spinning out.

On the restart immediately following the seventh caution, Jimmie Johnson led the field back to the green flag on lap 262, but was quickly passed by Kyle Busch. After the restart, the race had a 52 lap green flag run which ended because of the eighth caution due to Travis Kvapil's engine problems. The restart occurred on lap 321, with Kyle Busch in the lead. Busch led until lap 372 when the ninth caution came out because Scott Riggs had tire problems. All the leaders pitted, but while the top six replaced two tires, the rest changed all four. On the restart, Jeff Gordon led the field to the green flag with two laps to go. Newman passed Gordon before taking the white flag. Newman won his first race of the 2010 season, which was also his first victory since the 2008 Daytona 500.

Race results

References

Subway Fresh Fit 600
Subway Fresh Fit 600
NASCAR races at Phoenix Raceway